Brava Creole is the name given to the variant of Cape Verdean Creole spoken mainly in the Brava Island of Cape Verde. It belongs to the Sotavento Creoles branch. The speakers of this form of Capeverdean Creole are 8,000 (1.36% of the national population). One of the least spoken being seventh place and one of the firsts to have written literature, in which Eugénio Tavares wrote some of his poems.

Characteristics
Besides the main characteristics of Sotavento Creoles the Brava Creole has also the following ones:
 The progressive aspect of the present is formed by putting stâ before the verbs: stâ + V.
For example, coraçã , not coraçõ  “heart”; mã , not mõ  “hand”; razã , not razõ  “reason”.

Vocabulary

Grammar

Phonology

Alphabet

References

Further reading
 The Creole dialect of the island of Brava (Meintel, Deirdre, 1975) in Miscelânea luso-africana coord. Marius F. Valkhoff
 The syntax of Cape Verdean Creole. The Sotavento Varieties (Baptista, Marlyse, 2002)
 Crioulo de Cabo Verde — Situação Linguística da Zona do Barlavento (Delgado, Carlos Alberto; Praia: IBNL, 2008)

External links
A short poem in Brava Crioulo on a Cape Verde banknote.

Brava, Cape Verde